The 1985–86 New Jersey Nets season was the Nets' tenth season in the NBA. After starting the first half of the season strong with a 23–14 record, the Nets lost star Micheal Ray Richardson due to a lifetime ban from the NBA due to repeated drug offenses and Darryl Dawkins to injuries, and then stumbled and went 16–29, finishing with a 39–43 record and barely making it into the playoffs.

Draft picks

Roster

Roster notes
 The Nets let F Rod Higgins's 10-day contract expire.
 C Yvon Joseph was waived after playing 1 game in the NBA.
 G Micheal Ray Richardson received a lifetime ban on February 25 after he violated the league's drug policy three times.

Regular season

Season standings

Record vs. opponents

Game log

Playoffs

|- align="center" bgcolor="#ffcccc"
| 1
| April 18
| @ Milwaukee
| L 107–119
| Buck Williams (27)
| Buck Williams (14)
| Birdsong, Cook (7)
| MECCA Arena11,052
| 0–1
|- align="center" bgcolor="#ffcccc"
| 2
| April 20
| @ Milwaukee
| L 97–111
| Mike Gminski (28)
| Mike Gminski (13)
| Darwin Cook (7)
| MECCA Arena11,052
| 0–2
|- align="center" bgcolor="#ffcccc"
| 3
| April 22
| Milwaukee
| L 113–118
| Otis Birdsong (28)
| Buck Williams (10)
| Kelvin Ransey (4)
| Brendan Byrne Arena7,784
| 0–3

Player statistics

Season

Playoffs

Awards and records

Transactions

References

See also
 1985–86 NBA season

New Jersey Nets season
New Jersey Nets seasons
New Jersey Nets
New Jersey Nets
20th century in East Rutherford, New Jersey
Meadowlands Sports Complex